Addie is a given name, nickname and surname. It may refer to:

People with the name

Given name 
 Addie Aylestock (1909–1998), Canadian minister in the British Methodist Episcopal Church, the first woman minister to be ordained in that church, and the first black woman to be ordained in Canada
 Addie L. Ballou (1838–1916), American suffragist, poet, artist, author and lecturer
 Addie Cherry (1864–1942), one of the three Cherry Sisters, who performed a vaudeville act
 Addie Mae Collins, one of four children killed in the 1963 16th Street Baptist Church bombing, perpetrated by members of the Ku Klux Klan
 Addie Worth Bagley Daniels (1869–1943), American suffragist leader and writer
 Addie Elizabeth Davis (1917–2005), American Southern Baptist religious leader
 Addie Whiteman Dickerson (1878–1940), American businesswoman, politician, clubwoman, suffragist, and peace activist
 Addie Graham (1890–1978), American folk singer
 Addie Harris, a member of 1960s American girl group The Shirelles
 Addie Waites Hunton (1866–1943), American suffragist, race and gender activist, writer, political organizer, and educator
 Addie McPhail (1905–2003), American film actress, third wife of Fatty Arbuckle
 Addie Morrow (1928–2012), politician in Northern Ireland
 Addie MS (Addie Muljadi Sumaatmadja) (born 1959), Indonesian conductor
 Addie Jenne, American politician, member of the New York State Assembly, assumed office in 2009
 Addie Joss (1880–1911), American baseball pitcher
 Addie Pearl Nicholson (born 1931), American artist'
 Addie Pryor (born 1929), British alpine skier
 Addie C. Strong Engle (1845–1926), American author and publisher
 Addie Wagenknecht (born 1981), American artist and researcher
 Addie Walsh (born 1953), American television soap opera writer
 Addie Anderson Wilson (1876–1966), American composer, organist, and carillonist
 Addie L. Wyatt (1924–2012), African labor leader and civil rights activist

Nickname 
 Adriane "Addie" Hall (died 2006), murder-suicide victim featured in Ethan Brown's 2009 book Shake the Devil Off: A True Story of the Murder that Rocked New Orleans 
 Addie Joss (1880–1911), American Major League Baseball Hall-of-Fame pitcher
 Adam Lile (1885–1954), New Zealand rugby footballer in the 1900s
 Addie McCain (born 1999), American soccer player
 Addie Dickman Miller (1859–1936), American college professor and founder of Ruskin, Florida
 Addie Tambellini (1936–2004), Canadian ice hockey player

Surname 
 Bob Addie (1910–1982), American newspaper sportswriter
 Robert Addie (1960–2003), English actor
 Kim Addonizio (born Kim Addie in 1954), American poet and novelist, daughter of Bob and Pauline Addie
 Pauline Betz Addie (1919–2011), American tennis player

Fictional characters 
 Addie Bundren, a main character in the 1930 novel As I Lay Dying by William Faulkner
 Addie Horton, a character on the American soap opera Days of Our Lives
 Addie Singer, the main character of the American television series Unfabulous
 a character in the British 1940s comic strip series Addie and Hermy (1939–1941)
 Addie, in the 1971 novel Addie Pray, the 1973 movie adaptation Paper Moon (played by Tatum O'Neal) and the 1974 television series Paper Moon (played by Jodie Foster)
Addie Carle, a character in the book series The Misfits, by James Howe
Addie, one of the main characters in "What's Left of Me" by Kat Zhang
Addie LaRue, the main character of the novel The Invisible Life of Addie LaRue by V. E. Schwab

References 

Feminine given names
Lists of people by nickname